The  N.G. Zhiganov Kazan State Conservatory (Russian: Казанская государственная консерватория имени Н.Г. Жиганова) is a higher musical education institution in Kazan, Tatarstan, Russia. The conservatory was founded in 1945 by Soviet Tatar composer Najip Jihanov who was a rector of the institution during 1945-1988. In 2000 the Conservatory was named after him.

In 2009, the Conservatory had around 110 faculty members and 700 students. The educational programmes are realised at seven departments - piano, orchestra, choir conducting, vocal, folk instruments, theory and composition, Tatar musical art. Since 1989, the rector of the institution is professor , the first organist of Tatar ethnicity. Since 2021, the rector of the institution is professor .

Notable faculty
 Najip Jihanov
 Albert Leman
 Fuat Mansurov
 Mansur Mozaffarov
 Natan Rakhlin

Notable alumni
 Vlada Borovko - operatic soprano
 Larissa Diadkova - mezzo-soprano (transferred to Saint Petersburg Conservatory)
 Youri Egorov - pianist (transferred to Moscow Conservatory)
 Sofia Gubaidulina - composer (1954)
 Oleg Lundstrem - jazz composer and conductor (1953)
 Almaz Monasypov - composer, conductor and cellist.
 Mikhail Pletnev - pianist, conductor, and composer (transferred to Moscow Conservatory)

External links
Kazan Conservatory website (in Russian)
Kazan Conservatory website (in English)

 
Music schools in Russia
Educational institutions established in 1945
1945 establishments in the Soviet Union
Education in Kazan